The 2007 Polish Film Awards ran on March 5, 2007 at Teatr Narodowy. It was the 9th edition of Polish Film Awards: Eagles.

Awards nominees and winners
Winners are highlighted in boldface.

Best Film
 Plac Zbawiciela - Krzysztof Krauze, Joanna Kos-Krauze
 Jasminum - Jan Jakub Kolski
 Wszyscy jesteśmy Chrystusami - Marek Koterski

Best Actor
 Jasminum - Janusz Gajos
  - Leon Niemczyk
 Wszyscy jesteśmy Chrystusami - Marek Kondrat

Best Actress
 Plac Zbawiciela - Jowita Budnik
 Kochankowie z Marony - Karolina Gruszka
 Statyści - Kinga Preis

Supporting Actor
 Statyści - Krzysztof Kiersznowski
 Jasminum - Adam Ferency
 Wszyscy jesteśmy Chrystusami - Andrzej Chyra

Supporting Actress
 Plac Zbawiciela - Ewa Wencel
 Co słonko widziało - Jadwiga Jankowska-Cieślak
 Statyści - Anna Romantowska

Film Score
 Jasminum - Zygmunt Konieczny
 Palimpsest - Bartłomiej Gliniak
 Plac Zbawiciela - Paweł Szymański

Director
 Plac Zbawiciela - Krzysztof Krauze, Joanna Kos-Krauze
 Jasminum - Jan Jakub Kolski
 Wszyscy jesteśmy Chrystusami - Marek Koterski

Screenplay
 Wszyscy jesteśmy Chrystusami - Marek Koterski
 Statyści - Jarosław Sokół
 Plac Zbawiciela - Joanna Kos-Krauze, Krzysztof Krauze, Jowita Budnik, Arkadiusz Janiczek, Ewa Wencel

Cinematography
 Jasminum - Krzysztof Ptak
 Palimpsest - Arkadiusz Tomiak
 Wszyscy jesteśmy Chrystusami - Edward Kłosiński

Costume Design
 Jasminum - Ewa Helman
 Kochankowie Roku Tygrysa - Andrzej Szenajch
 Kochankowie z Marony - Magdalena Biedrzycka
 Oda do radości - Magdalena Biedrzycka
 Samotność w Sieci - Ewa Machulska
 Statyści - Paweł Grabarczyk
 Tylko mnie kochaj - Elżbieta Radke
 Wszyscy jesteśmy Chrystusami - Magdalena Biedrzycka, Justyna Stolarz

Sound
 Jasminum - Jacek Hamela
 Pope John Paul II - Maurizio Argentirei, Marek Wronko
 Kochankowie z Marony - Nikodem Wołk-Łaniewski
 Plac Zbawiciela - Nikodem Wołk-Łaniewski
 Statyści - Andrzej Bohdanowicz

Editing
 Wszyscy jesteśmy Chrystusami - Ewa Smal
 Kochankowie z Marony - Anna Wagner
 Plac Zbawiciela - Krzysztof Szpetmański

Production Design
 Jasminum - Joanna Doroszkiewicz
 Kochankowie z Marony - Jacek Osadowski
 Kto nigdy nie żył... - Janusz Sosnowski
 Wszyscy jesteśmy Chrystusami - Przemysław Kowalski

European Film
 Volver - Pedro Almodóvar (Spain)
 Copying Beethoven - Agnieszka Holland (Germany)
 The Wind That Shakes the Barley - Ken Loach (Republic of Ireland)

Special awards
 Audience Award: Jasminum
 Life Achievement Award: Witold Sobociński

Polish Film Awards ceremonies
Polish Film Awards
Polish Film Awards, 2007